Lansdowne Christian Church (LCC, also known as Hull Memorial) was established in 1903 in Lansdowne, Maryland. Part of the Christian Church (Disciples of Christ) denomination, Lansdowne Christian Church is located at 101 Clyde Avenue, Lansdowne, Baltimore, Maryland 21227 in southwest Baltimore County, on the southwestern outskirts of the City of Baltimore. Rev. J. B. DeHoff was the first pastor in the early 20th century. The church is currently led by the Rev. Trent Owings.

Weekly services are held each Sunday morning according to the longtime traditions of the Christian Church and Disciples of Christ, a major mainline Protestant denomination in America. Special holiday services are held as well. Community outreach events in the surrounding neighborhood of Lansdowne, plus adjacent Halethorpe, Relay, Arbutus, English Consul, Baltimore Highlands,and Elkridge. Further north in the city of Baltimore are Lakeland, Morrell Park, Violetville.  Many events and activities are conducted in collaboration with other local community churches. A Summer Concert series has conducted monthly concerts since 2004 with performers from the state capital of  Annapolis and neighboring counties.

Historical significance
The ground and building were donated by a local veteran of the American Civil War (1861-1865),  Charles Wesley Hull, and his wife Mary A. Hull. This gift was to honor the Union Army soldiers of the Civil War. The Hulls family also donated other property to benefit the community of early Lansdowne, including land to  establish the first volunteer fire company in Lansdowne in 1902. Charles W. Hull was a member and Commander of the Dushane Post #3 of the large influential veterans group, the Grand Army of the Republic (G.A.R.) . He originally served in Ohio before moving to Baltimore. He died March 17, 1926, and is buried in Baltimore.

The wood frame building covered with shingles and two/twin bell towers was listed on the National Register of Historic Places in 1977, maintained by the National Park Service of the United States Department of the Interior.  In 2004, LCC was added to the newly documented "Maryland's Civil War Trail" program (http:www.civilwartrails.org), a series of state-wide tourism initiatives in conjunction with several other surrounding states involved in the war. It catalogs the Border State's many historical sites from the war with mounted plaques (often with attached voice recorders for cellphones/smartphones), site brochures, guidebooks, internet website guide and occasional advertising. Historically unique, it is the only church in the United States ever dedicated to the old veterans association  Grand Army of the Republic, founded 1866 once composed of millions of members, and endured to 1956, when the last living veteran died. Each year on the last Sunday in May, a special GAR Memorial Service is held to commemorate the veterans of foreign wars by the GAR when some were still living in the 1910s, 1920s, 1930s to the 40s and now carried on by the descendants subsequent group, the Sons of Union Veterans of the Civil War (S.U.V.C.W.). Three beautiful stained glass windows were given to the church, two years after it was built in 1905 by the Grand Army of the Republic, Dushane Post #3 of the "Grand Army", and by the G.A.R. / S.U.V. female auxiliary of the Dushane Corps #3 of the Woman's Relief Corps. These windows still remain intact today.

Gallery

References

Church website
Baltimore Civil War Roundtable
Lansdowne Volunteer Fire Department

External links
, including undated photo, at Maryland Historical Trust
Lansdowne Christian Church website

Churches in Baltimore County, Maryland
Churches on the National Register of Historic Places in Maryland
Christian Church (Disciples of Christ) congregations
Maryland
National Register of Historic Places in Baltimore County, Maryland
Maryland in the American Civil War
1903 establishments in Maryland
Churches completed in 1903